350 North Orleans (formerly known as River North Point) is the official name of the 24-floor multipurpose building located in the River North community area of Chicago, at the intersection of the North Branch and the Main Branch of the Chicago River.  It was designed by Skidmore, Owings & Merrill.  In 1988, Helmut Jahn designed an enclosed pedestrian walking bridge over Orleans Street connecting the building to Merchandise Mart.  Originally built to serve as the world's largest wholesale buying center for the clothing industry, the building has more commonly known by several other names including River North Point, The Apparel Mart, and the Chicago Apparel Center.  The building opened on November 6, 1976.

The property was formerly owned by Marshall Field who sold it to Joseph P. Kennedy and the building's grand opening was attended by the entire Kennedy family. The family owned the land upon which the building was constructed for over 50 years. After the building was constructed in 1976, it remained in the family for over 20 years, but was sold to Vornado Realty Trust in 1998 as part of a larger $625 million ($ million today) transaction including Merchandise Mart and several other properties. Shorenstein Realty Services purchased the building in 2012 and subsequently sold to The Blackstone Group in 2015.

Background

The building is associated with the neighboring Merchandise Mart to its east, which it is connected to by way of an enclosed pedestrian walkway and the two buildings are sometimes jointly referred to as the Merchandise Mart and Apparel Center or Merchandise Mart and Apparel Center Annex. The building is one of four distinct properties that are known as Chicago's Mart Center complex, also known as World Trade Center Chicago: The Merchandise Mart, the Chicago Apparel Center, the Merchandise Mart ExpoCenter and Wolf Point. In James Thompson's original 58-block 1830 plat of Chicago, the property upon which the building is situated is represented by what was then designated as "Block 7" and a large portion of "Block 6", both of which are located at the fork of the Chicago River.

When the building was constructed, it was the world's largest wholesale buying center, featuring over 1,000 display showrooms representing over 3,000 clothing lines. It was Chicago's attempt to replace New York City, where businessmen have to travel to 20 different buildings to see a comparable variety of clothing as the world's fashion center. Its completion bolstered the Merchandise Mart's claim of being the "World's Largest Wholesale Buying Center". The building was completed just as the downtown office space market recovered from the 1973–75 recession and was part of a boom of Near North Side hotel constructions.  The adjacent parking lot has approximately 450 parking spaces. The grand opening ceremony on January 22, 1977 was attended by the Kennedy family, as well as Chicago Mayor Michael Bilandic. The grand opening celebration included a fashion show attended by 1,200 people.

The Kennedy-Vornado transaction occurred during an urban commercial real estate recovery that also saw the Sears Tower change hands at approximately the same time. Kennedy had purchased the property in 1945 or 1946 (depending on the source) from the Marshall Field family. John F. Kennedy, Jr. told a joke about Chicago that included the Merchandise Mart and Apparel Center: "In the '40s, my grandfather bought the Merchandise Mart. In the '70s, there was the Apparel Center. And in the '60s election, my family bought 20,000 votes."

There have been numerous plans to develop the property dating back to the late 1980s. In 2007, the Kennedys planned to develop the property with three high-rises and skyscrapers according to Cesar Pelli designs. The Wolf Point land is considered to have been the focal point of the earliest settlements in Chicago at the beginning of the 19th century.

In May 2015 The Blackstone Group purchased 350 North Orleans for $390 million from San Francisco-based owner Shorenstein Properties. Shorenstein had purchased the property in January 2012 for $228 million and invested an estimated $70 million in it.

Tenants 
In 2012 the last of the apparel showroom Tenants vacated and the building was converted to 100% commercial office. The existing Tenant base is primarily marketing firms and commodity trading firms. The largest tenants include Brookfield Properties (formerly GGP), WPP plc (Ogilvy (agency) and Ronin Capital.

Window Installation 

The building was constructed with no windows above the 3rd floor and below the 13th floor (the Hotel was constructed with windows for obvious reasons). In the mid-1990s as commercial office Tenants began to occupy the building, the building owners began replacing the original concrete pre-cast panels with windows. The current owner has had windows installed on 3 full floors and replaced partial height windows with full height windows on many of the floors that had already had windows installed. As of February 2018, there are only two elevations on the 8th floor of the north tower that are in need of window installation.

Tenant Amenity Spaces 
In 2018, the entire facade (from the 3rd floor upwards) was refinished and the original brown aggregate was painted, significantly improving its image.  In addition, the building owner redeveloped the existing conference facility and created a Tenant Lounge known as River Room which contains a Tenant exclusive conference facility and approximately 9,000 square feet of high end lounge space for Tenants to meet outside of the office in a more casual setting. River Room has expansive views of the Chicago River and an adjacent bar / eatery is currently under construction.

In May 2018 a high end fitness facility known as Studio350 was constructed in 10,000 square feet of vacant space on the 1st floor. The facility is exclusive to 350 North Orleans tenants and offers a full range of classes (yoga, spinning, strength training) and is operated by LifeStart on behalf of the building owner.

In May 2019 a roof deck opened, also exclusively for building tenants.

See also
Willis Tower, Chicago
EQ Office

Notes

External links

Apparel Center at Emporis.com
 EQ Office: 350 North Orleans

Buildings and structures completed in 1977
Skyscraper office buildings in Chicago
Wholesale markets
Skyscraper hotels in Chicago
Modernist architecture in Illinois
Skidmore, Owings & Merrill buildings
Kennedy family
1977 establishments in Illinois